Muhammad Naqib-ur-Rahman is a Pakistani Islamic Sufi scholar and leader. He is also Custodian of the Holy Shrine of Eidgah Sharif, Rawalpindi, Pakistan. He opposes terrorism.

References

1953 births
Living people
Islamic philosophers
Muslim reformers
Pakistani Sunni Muslim scholars of Islam